General elections will be held in Botswana in 2024 to elect a new National Assembly as well as local councils across the country. Ever since the first election in 1965, the Botswana Democratic Party  has held a majority of seats in the National Assembly and thus governed alone for 56 years without interruption making Botswana a dominant-party system.

Background
Following the 2019 elections, there were three opposing factions in the National Assembly: the Umbrella for Democratic Change (UDC), the Botswana Patriotic Front (BPF) and the Alliance for Progressives (AP). On 6 August 2022, the BPF joined the UDC alliance, uniting all opposition parties in the National Assembly save for the AP.

However, the Botswana Congress Party (BCP), a major member of the UDC has expressed interest in leaving the UDC alliance after disagreements between Dumelang Saleshando and Duma Boko. Saleshando had his position as the  Leader of Opposition in the National Assembly stripped away from him. Saleshando and his BCP party have proposed forming a new electoral alliance with the liberal AP party once the BCP leaves the UDC. The two parties held a joint rally in November 2022.

Primaries for the 2024 elections are set to commence as early as this year. The BDP has plans to hold its primaries in the third quarter of 2023.

Electoral system
For the 2024 elections, the membership of the National Assembly consists of 61 MPs elected in single-member constituencies by first-past-the-post voting, six members appointed by the governing party, and two ex-officio members (the President and the Speaker).

Voters are required to be citizens of Botswana and at least 18 years old, and have been resident in the country for at least 12 months prior to voter registration. People who are declared insane, hold dual citizenship, under a death sentence, convicted of an electoral offence or imprisoned for at least six months are not allowed to vote. Candidates have to be citizens of Botswana, at least 21 years old, without an undischarged bankruptcy and be able to speak and read English sufficiently well to take part in parliamentary proceedings. They must also obtain a nomination from at least two voters in their constituency and the support of seven. A deposit is required, which is refunded if the candidate receives at least 5% of the vote in the constituency. Members of the Ntlo ya Dikgosi cannot stand for election to the National Assembly.

The President of Botswana will be elected by the National Assembly after the general elections.

Seat redistribution
In accordance with section 64. (1) of the Constitution of Botswana, a Delimitation Commission was appointed on 13 May 2022 (following the release of the decennial 2022 Botswana Census) to redistribute the constituencies of the National Assembly. The National Assembly passed a bill increasing the number of constituencies by four from 57 to 61. 

Consultations with the public and various interest groups ran from 20 June to 28 November 2022. The Commission presented its finalised report to the President on 10 February 2023.

New seats
Mogoditshane East 
Mogoditshane West
Maun North
Okavango West
Okavango East 
Kgatleng Central

Eliminated seat
Mmathethe-Molapowabojang

Current composition

The table below shows the current seating arrangement by political party in the 12th National Assembly.

Opinion polling

Notes

References

Elections in Botswana
Botswana